St. Michael's College may refer to:

Asia
 Saint Michael's College of Laguna, Biñan, Laguna, Philippines
 St. Michael's College (Iligan), a Catholic private school in Iligan City, Philippines
 St. Michael's College National School, Batticaloa, Sri Lanka
 St. Michael's College, Homagama, in Homagama, Sri Lanka

Europe
 St Michael's College, Dublin, a private Catholic primary and secondary school in Ireland
 St Michael's College, Enniskillen, Northern Ireland
 St Michael's College, Listowel, Co. Kerry, Ireland
 St. Michael's College, Llandaff, Wales, an Anglican theological college
 St Michael's College, Tenbury (1856–1985), a college for boys in Worcestershire, England

North America
 Saint Michael's College, a private liberal arts college located in Colchester, Vermont, USA
 St. Michael's College School, a private Roman Catholic school for boys in Toronto, Ontario, Canada
 St. Michael's College, Toronto, a Catholic federated college and divinity school within the University of Toronto
 Santa Fe University of Art and Design, New Mexico, known as St. Michael's College until 1966

Elsewhere
 St Michael's College, Adelaide, Australia, a private Catholic primary and secondary school

See also
 St. Michael's School (disambiguation)
 St. Michael Academy (disambiguation)
 Saint Michael (disambiguation)